Bob Peterson may refer to:

Bob Peterson (North Dakota politician) (born 1951), North Dakota State Auditor
Bob Peterson (Ohio politician) (born 1962), member of the Ohio House of Representatives
Bob Peterson (baseball) (1884–1962), American baseball player
Bob Peterson (basketball) (1932–2011), American basketball player
Bob Peterson (filmmaker) (born 1961), American animator, screenwriter and voice actor
Bob Peterson (photographer) (born 1944), Canadian photographer

See also
Robert Peterson (disambiguation)